Vegard Båtnes Braaten (born 30 June 1987) is a Norwegian footballer who currently plays for Bossekop.

Career
He grew up near Sørkjosen, with his twin brother and fellow footballer Thomas, and made his senior debut for Nordreisa at the age of fourteen. He joined Tippeligaen side Tromsø in 2004. He only got three league games for the club, played mainly on the reserve team, and was loaned out to Tromsdalen and Alta. In December 2008 both Thomas and Vegard Braaten were signed by Alta on a permanent basis.
In June 2010 he joined Lokeren. In December 2011 he joined Bodø/Glimt from 2012, together with his twin brother Thomas Braaten.

Coaching career

Alta IF
Braaten retired at the end of 2018, end then became the assistant coach of Alta, under manager Bryant Lazaro.

Career statistics

References

External links

1987 births
Living people
Sportspeople from Tromsø
Norwegian footballers
Tromsø IL players
Tromsdalen UIL players
Alta IF players
K.S.C. Lokeren Oost-Vlaanderen players
FK Bodø/Glimt players
Eliteserien players
Belgian Pro League players
Norwegian expatriate footballers
Expatriate footballers in Belgium
Norwegian twins
Twin sportspeople
Norwegian expatriate sportspeople in Belgium
Association football forwards